Films Beget Films is a 1964 book written by Jay Leyda. It traces the history of compilation films constructed using found newsreel footage. He argues that documentary film is linked at an early stage to this newsreel footage.

Leyda's timeline
Early 20th century
 Newsreel footage of various events are compiled into showreels.

1920s
 Esfir Shub re-edits newsreel stock footage according to the principles of Soviet montage theory.
 Hans Richter makes his 'film essays'.

World War II
 Enemy footage is re-edited to make propaganda films, for example Frank Capra's Why We Fight.
 Len Lye and Alberto Cavalcanti make technical innovations.

Post-war
 Footage of the Holocaust is made into compilation films shown at the Nuremberg Trials. 
 Resnais's Night and Fog also uses Holocaust footage.

References
 Films Beget Films, Jay Leyda, London, George Allen & Unwin 1964.

Books about film
1964 non-fiction books
American non-fiction books
Hill & Wang books